Goniographa marcida is a moth of the family Noctuidae. It is found endemic to the Kopet-Dagh mountain system in Turkmenistan and Iran.

The wingspan is 27–35 mm.

External links
A Revision of the Palaearctic species of the Eugraphe (Hübner, 1821 - 1816) Generic complex. Parti. The genera Eugraphe and Goniographa (Lepidoptera, Noctuidae)

Noctuinae
Moths described in 1893